Andrija Gerić (born 24 January 1977) is a retired Serbian volleyball player who played on middle blocker position. Both in the club and in the national team he wore number 12.

Career
Gerić made a debut for the national team on 7 July 1995 in Greece when FR Yugoslavia defeated Greece 0-3. In 2000 in Sydney the Yugoslav national team (members of which were also Vladimir Grbić, Nikola Grbić, Goran Vujević, Ivan Miljković) won the Olympic gold medal.

During his club's career he played for OK Vojvodina, Bossini Montichiari‚ Lube Banca Marche Macerata and Icom Latina from Italy, Panathinaikos VC from Greece and Fenerbahçe from Turkey. He won Champions League, CEV Cup, domestic Championships of Serbia, Italy and Turkey, as well as Serbian and Italian domestic Cup.

Career 
 1993–99   OK Vojvodina Novi Sad
 1999-01   Bossini Montichiari
 2001-02   Lube Banca Marche Macerata
 2002-03   Icom Latina
 2003-08   Lube Banca Marche Macerata
 2008-09   Panathinaikos Athens
 2009-10   Top Volley Latina
 2010-11   Fenerbahçe Istanbul
 2011-12   OK Vojvodina Novi Sad

Palmares

Club
 Champions League:  2002
 CEV Cup:  2005, 2006
 Serbian Championship: 1994, 1995, 1996, 1997, 1998, 1999
 Serbian Cup: 1994, 1995, 1996, 1998, 2012
 Italian Championship:  2006
 Italian Cup:  2008
 Turkish Championship:  2011

National team
 Olympic gold medal:   2000
 Olympic bronze medal:   1996
 World Championship's silver medal:   1998
 European Championship's gold medal:   2001
 European Championship's silver medal:   1997
 European Championship's bronze medal:   2005, 2007
 World League's silver medal:   2003, 2006, 2008

Individual awards
 Olympic Games 2000: best blocker
 World League 2003:  best blocker
 World League 2003: best server
 World Cup 2003:  best blocker
 Best Sportsman of Vojvodina: 2003

External links

 Profile at Lube Banca Macerata website
 Profile at FIVB website
 Andrija Geric personal website

Living people
1977 births
Sportspeople from Novi Sad
Serbian men's volleyball players
Yugoslav men's volleyball players
Olympic volleyball players of Yugoslavia
Olympic volleyball players of Serbia and Montenegro
Olympic volleyball players of Serbia
Olympic gold medalists for Federal Republic of Yugoslavia
Olympic bronze medalists for Federal Republic of Yugoslavia
Volleyball players at the 1996 Summer Olympics
Volleyball players at the 2000 Summer Olympics
Volleyball players at the 2004 Summer Olympics
Volleyball players at the 2008 Summer Olympics
Fenerbahçe volleyballers
Panathinaikos V.C. players
Olympic medalists in volleyball
European champions for Serbia and Montenegro
Serbia and Montenegro men's volleyball players
Medalists at the 2000 Summer Olympics
Medalists at the 1996 Summer Olympics
Serbian expatriate sportspeople in Italy
Serbian expatriate sportspeople in Greece
Serbian expatriate sportspeople in Turkey